Brenda Eunice Flores Muñoz (born 4 September 1991) is a Mexican long-distance runner. She was a double gold medallist for Mexico at the 2014 Central American and Caribbean Games and a silver medallist at the 2015 Pan American Games. She represented the Americas at the 2014 IAAF Continental Cup.

Career
Flores grew up in the State of Mexico near the Mexican capital. She was inspired to take up athletics after seeing Mexican Ana Guevara claim the 400 metres world title in 2003. Flores made her start over 800 metres, but gradually moved up in distance as she failed to progress at shorter ones. Becoming a long-distance runner, she began instead to look to Mexico's former New York Marathon champion Adriana Fernández as a role model.

Flores claimed her first international medals at the 2013 Central American and Caribbean Championships in Athletics, held on home turf in Morelia, where she beat Pan American Games champion Adriana Muñoz to the 1500 metres gold medal and also claimed the 5000 metres silver medal behind her teammate Marisol Romero.

She set several personal bests in the 2014, including a 5000 m run of 15:30.87 minutes as runner-up at the Mt. SAC Relays, a 10,000 metres time of 32:49.09 minutes to win at the Portland Track Festival and a 3000 metres best of 9:10.29 minutes at the Meeting de Atletismo Madrid. Her native Mexico was the host of two major competitions that year and she won medals at both: she was the inaugural 5000 m champion at the Pan American Sports Festival and claimed a 5000 m/10,000 m long-distance double at the Central American and Caribbean Games, which included a games record in the shorter event. She also gained her first global level call-up that year, representing the Americas at the 2014 IAAF Continental Cup, where she placed sixth in the 5000 m.

Flores ran at the New York Half Marathon in March 2015 and although she set a new best of 73:54 minutes for the distance, this was only enough for 19th in the high calibre race. Returning to the track, she knocked over a minute off her 10,000 m at the Payton Jordan Cardinal Invitational in May. She reached another international podium at the 2015 Pan American Games in Toronto, taking the 5000 m silver medal behind Brazil's Juliana Paula dos Santos.

In 2020, she competed in the women's half marathon at the 2020 World Athletics Half Marathon Championships held in Gdynia, Poland.

Personal bests
3000 metres – 9:10.29 min (2014)
5000 metres – 15:30.87 min (2014)
10,000 metres – 31:45.16 min (2015)
Half marathon – 73:54 min (2015)

International competitions

References

External links

Pan American Games profile

Living people
1991 births
Sportspeople from the State of Mexico
Mexican female long-distance runners
Mexican female middle-distance runners
Pan American Games medalists in athletics (track and field)
Athletes (track and field) at the 2015 Pan American Games
World Athletics Championships athletes for Mexico
Pan American Games gold medalists for Mexico
Pan American Games silver medalists for Mexico
Athletes (track and field) at the 2016 Summer Olympics
Olympic athletes of Mexico
Central American and Caribbean Games gold medalists for Mexico
Competitors at the 2014 Central American and Caribbean Games
Central American and Caribbean Games medalists in athletics
Medalists at the 2015 Pan American Games
21st-century Mexican women